Van Kleef v Colonial Mutual General Insurance Co (NZ) Ltd is a cited case in New Zealand regarding remoteness of loss.

References

New Zealand contract case law
2001 in New Zealand law
High Court of New Zealand cases
2001 in case law